Dawat is a 1974 Bollywood drama film directed by B. R. Ishara.

Cast
Dilip Dutt   
Jayshree Gadkar   
Satish Kaul   
Manmohan Krishna   
Sanjeev Kumar   
Raza Murad   
Sarita   
Johnny Walker

Soundtrack

External links
 

1974 films
1970s Hindi-language films
1974 drama films
Films directed by B. R. Ishara